Yekaterinburg Circus is a circus building for 2,558 spectators in Yekaterinburg, Russia.

History 
The building was first opened on February 1, 1980.

References

External links
Short history of the Ekaterinburg State Circus | Tourist Information Service Ekaterinburg
Pictures of the Ekaterinburg State Circus | Instagram

Circuses
Event venues established in 1980
Buildings and structures in Yekaterinburg
Tourist attractions in Sverdlovsk Oblast